17 Songs is a 1990 album by Maria Farantouri. The album includes 17 songs on the album in Greek, Portuguese, Spanish, including covers of Caruso (song) by Leo Brouwer and Once Upon a Summertime. The album also includes 3 songs from a 1989-1990 collaboration with Vangelis, with Greek lyrics by Michalis Bourboulis.

Track listing
Caruso (song) (duet with Dionisios Savopolous)
San Vicente
Adio querida
Filho 
Once Upon a Summertime - Eddie Barclay / Michel Legrand / Eddy Marnay / Johnny Mercer 
Solo le pido a dios
Sol negro (duet with Mercedes Sosa)
Tora Xero - music Vangelis, Greek lyrics Michalis Bourboulis.
La canzone del mal di luna 
Youkali 		
 		
Wenn ich mir was Wuenschen.. 
Nanourisma (duet with Mercedes Sosa)		
San Elektra - music Vangelis, Greek lyrics Michalis Bourboulis.		
Sarracini 		
Esta  montana 		
Odi a - music Vangelis, Greek lyrics Michalis Bourboulis.

References

1990 albums